Kelly Chiavaro (born 3 July 1996) is a Canadian soccer player who plays as a goalkeeper for Flamengo.

Career

In 2016, Chiavaro joined Colgate Raiders in the United States. Before the second half of 2020–21, she signed for Israeli club Maccabi Emek Hefer.

In 2021, she signed for Napoli in the Italian top flight. In 2022, Chiavaro signed for Brazilian club Flamengo.

References

External links

 Kelly Chiavaro at playmakerstats.com

1996 births
Women's association football goalkeepers
Canadian expatriate sportspeople in Brazil
Canadian expatriate sportspeople in Israel
Canadian expatriate sportspeople in Italy
Canadian expatriate sportspeople in the United States
Canadian expatriate women's soccer players
Canadian people of Italian descent
Canadian women's soccer players
Clube de Regatas do Flamengo (women) players
Colgate Raiders women's soccer players
Colgate University alumni
Expatriate women's footballers in Brazil
Expatriate women's footballers in Israel
Expatriate women's footballers in Italy
Expatriate women's soccer players in the United States
Ligat Nashim players
Living people
People from Saint-Eustache, Quebec
S.S.D. Napoli Femminile players